The 2010 Sanyuan Foods China Open was a professional ranking snooker tournament that took place between 29 March and 4 April 2010 at the Beijing University Students' Gymnasium in Beijing, China. This was the first time that the China Open was sponsored by Sanyuan Foods.

Peter Ebdon was the defending champion, but he lost 2–5 to Ding Junhui in the quarter-finals.

Mark Williams won in the final, 10–6, against Ding Junhui.

Prize fund
The breakdown of prize money for this year is shown below:

Winner: £55,000
Runner-up: £28,000
Semi-final: £14,000
Quarter-final: £7,525
Last 16: £5,370
Last 32: £3,640
Last 48: £2,050
Last 64: £1,400

Stage one highest break: £500
Stage two highest break: £2,000
Stage one maximum break: £1,000
Stage two maximum break: £20,000
Total: £300,000

Wildcard round
These matches were played in Beijing on 29 March 2010.

Main draw

Final

Qualifying
These matches took place between 2 and 5 February 2010 at the Pontin's Centre, Prestatyn, Wales.

Century breaks

Qualifying stage centuries

 134, 105  Matthew Selt
 134  David Gray
 132, 100  Robert Milkins
 132  Jimmy Robertson
 122  Tony Drago
 119  Jamie Cope
 117  Matthew Stevens
 114, 100  Judd Trump

 112, 102  Barry Pinches
 112, 101  Tom Ford
 111  Dominic Dale
 110, 108  Jordan Brown
 110  Rory McLeod
 109, 100, 100  Sam Baird
 100  Craig Steadman

Televised stage centuries

 147, 112, 102  Neil Robertson
 143  Mark Davis
 137, 127, 126, 125, 121, 116, 107, 101, 100  Ding Junhui
 132, 126  Stephen Hendry
 130  Peter Ebdon
 127  Shaun Murphy
 120  Tony Drago
 116, 110, 108  Mark Williams

 116, 101  Mark Selby
 116  Yu Delu
 110  Marco Fu
 104  Liu Chuang
 102  Mark Allen
 102  Bjorn Haneveer
 100  Mark King

References

2010
2010 in snooker
2010 in Chinese sport
March 2010 sports events in China
April 2010 sports events in China
2010